Bardol  is a village in the southern state of Karnataka, India. It is located in the Chadchan taluk of Bijapur district in Karnataka.

Demographics
In the 2001 India census, Bardol had a population of 5,537 with 2,942 males and 2,595 females.

In the 2011 census, the population of Bardol was reported as 6,866. Bardol is famous for Grapes production. It's also famous for amenities it equipped with.

See also
 Bijapur
 Districts of Karnataka

References

External links
 http://Bijapur.nic.in/

Villages in Bijapur district, Karnataka